Borg Island is an island  long in the eastern part of the Øygarden Group. It was mapped by Norwegian cartographers from aerial photos taken by the Lars Christensen Expedition, 1936–37, and called by them "Borgoy" (castle island).

See also 
 List of Antarctic and sub-Antarctic islands

References 

Islands of Kemp Land